Brightside is an EP by Indonesian rapper Rich Brian, released on 20 January 2022 via 88rising. The project was surprise-released, with no prior announcement, alongside a music video for the song "Getcho Mans". The EP was preceded by the 2021 single "New Tooth", which also got a music video release.

Track listing

Personnel 
 Rich Brian – vocals (all tracks), recording (4)
 Warren Hue – vocals (3)
 Gentry Studer – mastering
 Christian Dold – mixing (all tracks), recording (2)
 Vic Wainstein – recording (1)
 Brian Cruz – recording (3)

References 

2022 EPs
Rich Brian albums
88rising EPs